Bishop Vaughan Catholic School is a coeducational Catholic secondary school in the Morriston area of Swansea. It is under the remit of the Diocese of Menevia.

The school was founded in 1966 by people of Swansea. It comprises a number of buildings: the main teaching block, a four-storey block, craft block, music suite, dining areas and gymnasiums.

External links
School website
Estyn Inspection Reports

Secondary schools in Swansea
Catholic secondary schools in the Diocese of Menevia
Educational institutions established in 1966
1966 establishments in Wales